24 gymnasts from 19 countries competed in the qualification round of the Gymnastics at the 2004 Summer Olympics – Women's rhythmic individual all-around competition. The types of apparatus included were the hoop, ball, clubs and ribbon. The top 10 gymnasts advanced to the final round.

Final qualifiers

Overall results

Results in particular events

Hoop

Ball

Clubs

Ribbon

Notes

Women's artistic qualification
2004 in women's gymnastics